Chinik may have one of the following meanings.

The former name of Golovin, Alaska.
An alternate spelling of Chainik.
Yiddish slang for "head" (the literal meaning is "teakettle").